HMS Tavistock was a 50-gun fourth rate ship of the line of the Royal Navy.

She was built by Hugh Blaydes at Blaydes Yard in Kingston upon Hull to the draught specified in the 1745 Establishment. She was fitted out in Portsmouth and launched on 26 August 1747.

She had two commanders: Captain Justinian Nutt and Commodore Francis Holburne and had a crew of 350 men. She served in North America and the Caribbean (based at the Leeward Islands.

Tavistock was converted to serve as a hulk in 1758, and was broken up in Woolwich in 1768.

Notes

References
 

Ships of the line of the Royal Navy
1747 ships